Zagajnik may refer to the following places in Poland:
Zagajnik, Lower Silesian Voivodeship (south-west Poland)
Zagajnik, Lublin Voivodeship (east Poland)